Jochem Jacobs (born 26 March 1977) is a Dutch guitarist, producer and recording engineer, noted for his work as founder, guitarist and producer for Textures. He works at Split Second Sound, a studio in Amsterdam, Netherlands. He has been involved with the mixing, mastering and production of all Textures albums so far, as well as other bands such as Epica, Autumn, Stream of Passion, Heidevolk, Severe Torture, Hord, In-Quest, Almah, Izegrim, The Red Shore, Intwine, Face Tomorrow, Kingfisher Sky and Devious. He is endorsed by Mayones guitars.

He played with his brother Sander in the Dutch crossover metal band Ground Control from 1995 to 2001, and released 2 demos and one album.

About the recordings of Texture's Dualism album, he said:

Equipment

Mayones Guitars
 Peavey 5150

Discography

With Ground Control
The Infamous $50 Tape (1995)
Access 2 Control (1996)
God-Mode (1998)

With Textures
Polars (2003)
Drawing Circles (2006)
Silhouettes (2008)
Dualism (2011)

References

External links
Textures official website
Textures at Encyclopaedia Metallum
Textures at Last.fm

Dutch guitarists
Dutch record producers
Dutch heavy metal guitarists
Dutch heavy metal keyboardists
Dutch male guitarists
Living people
1977 births
21st-century guitarists
21st-century male musicians